Rainbow is a census designated place (CDP) in northern San Diego County in the U.S. state of California. The population was 1,832 at the 2010 census, down from 2,026 at the 2000 census.

Geography
Rainbow is located at  (33.411213, -117.149209).

Climate
According to the Köppen Climate Classification system, Rainbow has a warm-summer Mediterranean climate, abbreviated "Csa" on climate maps.

Demographics

2010
At the 2010 census Rainbow had a population of 1,832. The racial makeup of Rainbow was 1,324 (72.3%) White, 19 (1.0%) African American, 12 (0.7%) Native American, 43 (2.3%) Asian, 12 (0.7%) Pacific Islander, 371 (20.3%) from other races, and 51 (2.8%) from two or more races. Hispanic or Latino of any race were 665 people (36.3%).

The census reported that 1,745 people (95.3% of the population) lived in households, no one lived in non-institutionalized group quarters and 87 (4.7%) were institutionalized.

There were 644 households, 173 (26.9%) had children under the age of 18 living in them, 375 (58.2%) were opposite-sex married couples living together, 39 (6.1%) had a female householder with no husband present, 26 (4.0%) had a male householder with no wife present.  There were 26 (4.0%) unmarried opposite-sex partnerships, and 5 (0.8%) same-sex married couples or partnerships. 163 households (25.3%) were one person and 81 (12.6%) had someone living alone who was 65 or older. The average household size was 2.71.  There were 440 families (68.3% of households); the average family size was 3.20.

The age distribution was 343 people (18.7%) under the age of 18, 153 people (8.4%) aged 18 to 24, 412 people (22.5%) aged 25 to 44, 555 people (30.3%) aged 45 to 64, and 369 people (20.1%) who were 65 or older.  The median age was 45.3 years. For every 100 females, there were 97.2 males.  For every 100 females age 18 and over, there were 96.7 males.

There were 719 housing units at an average density of 65.1 per square mile, of the occupied units 475 (73.8%) were owner-occupied and 169 (26.2%) were rented. The homeowner vacancy rate was 2.6%; the rental vacancy rate was 6.1%.  1,230 people (67.1% of the population) lived in owner-occupied housing units and 515 people (28.1%) lived in rental housing units.

2000
At the 2000 census there were 2,026 people, 739 households, and 523 families in the CDP. The population density was 126.0 inhabitants per square mile (48.7/km). The racial makeup of the CDP was 81.4% White, 0.2% African American, 0.8% Native American, 2.4% Asian, 0.8% Pacific Islander, 11.5% from other races, and 3.0% from two or more races. Hispanic or Latino of any race were 21.8%.

Of the 739 households 26.9% had children under the age of 18 living with them, 62.2% were married couples living together, 5.3% had a female householder with no husband present, and 29.2% were non-families. 21.7% of households were one person and 10.3% were one person aged 65 or older.  The average household size was 2.73 and the average family size was 3.15.

The age distribution was 23.7% under the age of 18, 6.0% from 18 to 24, 25.8% from 25 to 44, 26.8% from 45 to 64, and 17.8% 65 or older.  The median age was 42 years. For every 100 females, there were 109.1 males.  For every 100 females age 18 and over, there were 110.9 males.

The median household income was $40,938 and the median family income  was $44,833. Males had a median income of $38,661 versus $32,917 for females. The per capita income for the CDP was $19,890.  About 15.8% of families and 23.2% of the population were below the poverty line, including 33.4% of those under age 18 and 5.5% of those age 65 or over.

History
The area, previously known as "Vallecitos", (little valley), was renamed "Rainbow Valley" in the late 1880s, after Mr. James Peebles Marshall Rainbow, who bought a homestead there.

In October 2007, the Santa Ana winds fueled a major wildfire in the area.

The town has many palm tree farms, and is a gateway to the city of Temecula.

Government

References

Census-designated places in San Diego County, California
North County (San Diego County)
Census-designated places in California